The 2006 Daytona 500 was the first stock car race of the 2006 NASCAR Nextel Cup Series. The 48th running of the event, it was held on February 19, 2006, in Daytona Beach, Florida, at Daytona International Speedway before a crowd of 200,000 spectators. Hendrick Motorsports driver Jimmie Johnson won the 203-lap race starting from the ninth position. Casey Mears of Chip Ganassi Racing finished second and Ryan Newman took third for Penske Racing South.

Jeff Burton won the third pole position of his career by posting the fastest lap in qualifying. He led the first 18 laps until the first round of pit stops. On the 28th lap, Tony Stewart became the leader for the following 20 laps. From laps 58 to 80, Matt Kenseth led, before Dale Earnhardt Jr. took the lead on the 86th lap. Earnhardt led seven times for a total of 32 laps, more than any other driver. Before the final round of pit stops, Johnson became the new leader by passing his teammate Brian Vickers on lap 187. He maintained the lead over Newman and Mears to win under caution after Greg Biffle lost control of his car on the final lap. There were 11 cautions by a record-breaking 32 lead changes by 18 different drivers during the race.

It was Johnson's maiden Daytona 500 win, his first at a restrictor plate track at either Talladega Superspeedway or Daytona International Speedway, and the 19th of his career. The victory came after Johnson's crew chief Chad Knaus was suspended for unapproved alterations to his car, for which he received a fine of $25,000, and was suspended until March 22. It was the first of five races of the 2006 season that Johnson won en route to claiming his first of seven NASCAR Cup Series championships at the end of the season.

As this was the first race of the season, Johnson led the Drivers' Championship with 190 points, followed by Mears and Newman on 170 points each. Elliott Sadler and Stewart were fourth and fifth with 165 and 160 points, respectively. In the Manufacturers' Championship, Chevrolet led with nine points, ahead of Dodge in second with six points, and the third-placed Ford with four points. The race attracted 20 million television viewers.

Background

The Daytona 500 was the first of 36 scheduled stock car races of the 2006 NASCAR Nextel Cup Series, and the 48th running of the event. It was held on February 19, 2006, in Daytona Beach, Florida, at Daytona International Speedway, a superspeedway that holds NASCAR races. Its standard track is a four-turn, 2.5-mile (4.0 km) superspeedway. Daytona's turns are banked at 31 degrees, and the front stretch—the location of the finish line—is banked at 18 degrees.

The Daytona 500 was conceived by NASCAR founder Bill France Sr., who built the Daytona International Speedway. The race was first held in 1959; it is the successor to shorter races held on beaches around Daytona Beach. It has been the opening round of the NASCAR season since 1982, and from 1988, it has been one of four events that require cars to run restrictor plates. The Daytona 500 is often regarded as NASCAR's most prestigious race because it offers the most prize money in American auto racing. Victory is considered equal to winning either the World Series, the Super Bowl or The Masters. The race is often called the "Great American Race" or the "Super Bowl of Stock Car Racing".

In preparation for the race, NASCAR held several test sessions on January 9–11 (for teams who finished in an odd-number position in the 2005 car owner points standings) and January 16–18, 2006 (for teams who finished in an even-number position in the 2005 car owner points standings). Every test session began at 9 a.m. EST, stopped for one hour from 12:00 – 1:00 pm. EST, and concluded at 5:00 pm. EST.

After a large amount of bump drafting was observed during the Budweiser Shootout, NASCAR instituted two "no zones" at the exit of corners, which series officials and multiple digital cameras would check for drivers attempting to ram their cars into the rear of other vehicles in order to gain an aerodynamic or overtaking advantage. Drivers would be penalized with either a drive-through penalty or disqualification from the race depending on the severity of the bump. Robin Pemberton, NASCAR's vice-president of competition, stated that bump drafting in the turns would no longer be tolerated. He commented, "It crosses over the line when the drivers are in the corner. That is not a good place to bump-draft. A straight line, it's not the best either, but a straight line is far safer than in the corners. There's guys that haven't totally honed the craft of bump drafting."

Practice and qualifier

A total of six practice sessions were held before the Sunday race. The first two were held on February 11 and lasted 120 and 90 minutes each. The next two took place on February 15 after the first qualifier and were shortened to 60 minutes each. Two days later, one more practice session was scheduled, which lasted for 75 minutes. The final practice session was held on February 18 and ran for 60 minutes. In the first practice session, Kevin Harvick was fastest with a lap of 47.771 seconds, ahead of Gordon, Kyle Petty, Elliott Sadler, Johnson, Jarrett, Elliott, Jeremy Mayfield, Bobby Labonte, and Joe Nemechek. With a time of 47.757 seconds, Sadler led the rain-curtailed second practice session; Gordon was 0.219 seconds slower as he duplicated his first-practice result in second. Elliott improved to third. Jarrett, Johnson, Marlin, Mayfield, Clint Bowyer, Denny Hamlin, and Kurt Busch followed in positions four to ten. Kurt Busch hit a large section of cardboard on the back stretch, stopping the session after an hour.

There were 58 cars entered the qualifier on February 12 for 43 spots in the race; due to NASCAR's qualifying procedure only 43 could race. Each driver ran two laps, and unlike most races during the season, the qualifying session determined the first two positions. The remainder of the field needed to qualify by the 2006 Gatorade Duels, through which 37 drivers were allocated largely in order of their finishing positions. Three remaining drivers were chosen through their qualifying speed, while one prior series champion qualified via a champions' provisional. The weather was cold with a tailwind. Jeff Burton was the 34th driver to set a lap time; he took his first pole position at Daytona International Speedway, his first since the 2000 Chevrolet Monte Carlo 400, and the third of his career with a time of 47.581 seconds. He was joined on the grid's front row by Gordon who was 0.169 seconds slower. Kenseth was the only driver not to set a time because of a flat left-rear tire to start his lap. After qualifying, Burton said, "We just got lucky. That's the best wind we've had down here in all of testing and everything else. It just played into our hands, and we had a car that could take advantage of it.", and, "Today had nothing to do with me. The only impact that I had on today at all was to be a warm-blooded person that could mash the gas and turn the thing on. I think Michael Waltrip once said a drunk monkey could do it, and I was a drunk monkey, I guess."

After post-qualifying inspection, Johnson's lap times were deleted as a result of an illegal rear window template lowered by a track bar adjuster to the right rear of his vehicle, providing Johnson with an aerodynamic advantage. Terry Labonte also had his lap times disallowed after it was discovered that his car's carburetor had non-sanctioned modifications. Both Johnson and Labonte were ordered to start from the rear of the field in the Gatorade Duels. NASCAR did not confiscate Johnson's primary car, and his crew corrected the infraction to enable its return to competition. NASCAR ejected Johnson's crew chief Chad Knaus from the Daytona 500, which was unappealable. Knaus' role was assumed by Hendrick Motorsports lead engineer Darian Grubb.

In the third practice session, Dale Earnhardt Jr. led with a 47.024 seconds lap, ahead of Kenseth, Ryan Newman, Kevin Lepage, Scott Wimmer, Jeff Green. Kurt Busch, David Stremme, Burton, and Jamie McMurray. Petty and Kenny Wallace had anxious moments while drafting other cars; both drivers were able to control their vehicles. Both Hamlin and Derrike Cope made contact with a wall beside the track; they continued with no major damage to their cars. Brian Vickers led the fourth practice session with a 46.946 seconds time, with Mike Wallace, Greg Biffle, Jarrett, Kenseth, Bowyer, Robby Gordon, Burton, Chad Chaffin and Dave Blaney in positions two to ten. Mike Wallace had a tire detach and his oil line failed 15 minutes into the session. 

Sadler and Jeff Gordon were the winners of the Gatorade Duels. The qualifying grid was finalized with Sadler, Kyle Busch, Carl Edwards, McMurray, Earnhardt, Bobby Labonte, Johnson and Mark Martin completing the top ten starters. The last three drivers who qualified on the basis of their qualifying speed were Travis Kvapil, Hermie Sadler, and Kirk Shelmerdine. Terry Labonte used a champions' provisional to start the race. The fifteen drivers who failed to qualify were Scott Riggs, Kenny Wallace, Wimmer, Mike Skinner, Cope, Larry Gunselman, Chad Blount, Larry Foyt, Andy Belmont, Randy LaJoie, Morgan Shepherd, Chaffin, Carl Long, Paul Menard, and Stanton Barrett. Marlin switched to a back-up car after he was collected in an accident in the first qualifying race. Nemechek's team changed his engine after it failed in the second qualifying event. 

Stremme paced the fifth practice session with a 47.038 seconds, 0.001 seconds faster than Robby Gordon in second. Harvick, Green, Elliott, Ken Schrader, McMurray, Kasey Kahne, Earnhardt and Kurt Busch followed in the top ten. In the final practice session, which took place in warm weather conditions that prompted drivers to limit their running to preserve their cars, Schrader recorded the event's fastest overall lap of 46.708 seconds; Martin Truex Jr., Earnhardt, Green, Lepage, Jarrett, Marlin, Petty, Burton, and Brent Sherman completed the top ten ahead of the race. The session passed without major incident. Bobby Labonte's engine failed late in practice, and his team changed engines. Vickers glanced the turn three wall and resumed without any substantial car damage.

Qualifying results

Race
As Nemechek's crew prepared for the event at 9:00 am, his car had a small engine compartment fire after oil-covered tire rubber in his exhaust header ignited, prompting his team to change the wiring harness and the aluminium heat shield beside the engine's header. Live television coverage began at 1:30 pm EDT in the United States on NBC. Ronald Durham, pastor of Greater Friendship Missionary Baptist Church in Daytona Beach, Florida, began pre-race ceremonies with an invocation. Hip-hop singer Fergie of The Black Eyed Peas performed the national anthem, and actor James Caan commanded the drivers to start their engines. During the pace laps, Bobby Labonte and Nemechek moved to the rear of the field because they changed their engines. Marlin did the same after he switched to a back-up car.

The race began at 2:45 pm. Burton maintained his pole position advantage to lead the field into the first turn. In turn three, Green's left-rear tire went flat; no caution was prompted because the carcass rolled into the infield grass. By lap three, two distinct packs of cars had been established; 27 vehicles were in the lead pack, and the rest were five seconds behind Earnhardt made it three abreast through the tri-oval on the fifth lap; it returned to being two abreast entering the back straightaway. After starting 26th, Harvick advanced to tenth by lap nine, and Petty dropped 17 positions over the same distance. The top three cars established a single file on lap 15, with the next six rows two abreast. Two laps later, the first caution was given; Vickers lost control of his car leaving turn two, and Truex served to avoid him; Vickers made heavy contact with a right-hand side wall, causing his car's right side sheet metal to rub against the right rear tire. During the caution, the field (including Burton), made pit stops for fuel and tires. Sadler led Earnhardt at the lap 21 restart.

One lap later, Earnhardt steered right to attempt a pass on Sadler without drafting assistance. He was unsuccessful and dropped back. Jeff Gordon became the new leader on the 24th lap and Sadler fell to fourth. On lap 25, Kenseth assumed the first position by overtaking Gordon, with Earnhardt second and Stewart third. Earnhardt took the lead from Kenseth two laps later, as Stewart got loose in turn two, and slid up towards Kenseth; he regained control of his car. On the 28th lap, McMurray provided Stewart with drafting assistance to pass Earnhardt for first. Six laps later, Mike Wallace came over into Mayfield, who in turn, went into Biffle; no caution was needed. Mayfield went down pit road for repairs on the lap. He made a second pit stop on lap 38 because his right-front tire was cut from a fender. On lap 40, Stewart remained first, with McMurray second. Mayfield made a third pit stop for sheet metal repairs on the next lap.

On the 48th lap, just after Stewart lost the lead to McMurray, Gordon lost control of his vehicle and made contact with Stewart's front. Both drivers were sent into the right-hand wall exiting the second turn, and sustained right-hand side damage. The field (including McMurray) made pit stops under caution. McMurray sustained metal sheet damage from being dropped off his team's jack, and Edwards had front-end repairs made. As fog descended on the track between turns one and three, reducing visibility, Newman led the field at the lap 52 restart, followed by Kenseth. Six laps later, Kenseth received assistance from Kyle Busch to take the lead from Newman. Kyle Busch lost positions from the 61st lap, while Kurt Busch moved to third. By the 75th lap, Stewart returned to 13th place. Four laps later, a multi-car collision caused a third caution. Green lost control of his car from contact with Jarrett, and slid upward into J. J. Yeley's path in turn three. Nemechek was collected, and the front of Edwards' car momentarily mounted Petty's left-side fender; both slid into the infield grass at turn three.

The leaders (including Kenseth) made pit stops under caution. Kurt Busch and Travis Kvapil both staggered their pit stops, leading one lap each before making their stops. Racing resumed on lap 85 with Kenseth leading and Harvick in second. That lap, as the field spread out in turns one and two, Harvick passed Kenseth to claim the lead. Earnhardt went left and used Nemechek's slower car to get ahead of Harvick for first place on lap 86. Four laps later, Kenseth received drafting assistance from Kurt Busch to reclaim the first position from Harvick on the right. A fourth caution was prompted when a spring rubber was located on track during lap 91. The leaders (including Kenseth) chose to make pit stops during the caution. Earnhardt led at the lap 96 restart. Entering turn three on the lap, Kenseth overtook Johnson for second. Martin received drafting assistance from Stewart to pass Earnhardt on the right for the lead on the 104th lap.

The fifth caution was waved on lap 107. Stewart turned left, making contact with the front of Kenseth's car entering the third turn. This sent Kenseth into the infield grass and went backward onto the track in turn three and hit no other vehicle en route to glancing the wall. The field (including Martin) chose to enter pit road during the caution. Earnhardt took the lead after all cars made their pit stops. In the meantime, Stewart was sent to the end of the longest line for "aggressive driving". As Stewart and Kenseth exited pit road, Kenseth turned to the outside into turn one, and hit the right-hand quarter of Stewart's car. NASCAR issued an order to Kenseth to serve a drive-through penalty. The race resumed on lap 112, with Earnhardt leading a lap before Biffle overtook him. Kenseth disputed his penalty and he remained on track until the 114th lap. Earnhardt retook the lead for two laps, before Kyle Busch assumed it from laps 116 and 120 until Johnson passed him on lap 121. On lap 124, Robby Gordon's right-front tire failed in turn three, and he hit the wall, triggering the sixth caution.

During the caution, the field (including Johnson) went down pit road. Elliott led the field on lap 126 before making his pit stop. Stewart drove over his pit stall jack, and was ordered to drop to the end of the nearest longest line. Martin led at the lap 129 restart, followed by Johnson. That lap, Johnson attempted an unsuccessful pass Martin on the outside. Martin then pulled away with drafting aid from Earnhardt as the top six formed a single line by lap 132. Earnhardt took the lead back ten laps later, and Vickers passed his teammate Johnson on the outside on lap 143. On the following lap, Vickers took the lead. Lap 155 saw the seventh caution; debris was located in the groove on the frontstretch. All of the leaders including Vickers made pit stops under caution. Johnson went onto the grass to avoid hitting Newman. Earnhardt led Vickers and Newman at the lap 160 restart. Newman passed Earnhardt on the outside for the lead four laps later, which Earnhardt retook momentarily. On lap 167, Kurt Busch moved to second.

Kahne helped Earnhardt move to second on lap 171. Five laps later, Kvapil's right front tire burst, causing him to crash into the turn three right-hand wall, and prompting the eighth caution. During the caution, all cars including Newman entered pit road. Vickers led at the lap 181 restart after having no tires fitted to his car. Every driver, except for Kyle Busch and Kurt Busch, turned onto the inside. Just as Johnson overtook his teammate Vickers on the outside in turn two for the lead with Newman's help, the ninth caution was waved on the 187th lap, when McMurray hit the left-rear of Kurt Busch's car on the backstretch, sending Busch into a barrier. Marlin and Jeff Gordon were collected and debris hit Stewart's car. Johnson maintained the lead at the restart on lap 190. Newman bump drafted Vickers for two laps, before passing him for second, and attempted to challenge Johnson. Casey Mears then overtook Vickers for third.

Johnson led the next seven laps before a tenth caution flag was necessitated for an accident. Burton drifted up on the backstretch, and hit McMurray, causing Burton to collide with the wall. Burton went down into Bobby Labonte's right-hand side, causing both drivers to hit the wall, and Labonte collected Hamlin. During the caution, one of Newman's mechanics went to speak to representatives from Mears' and Sadler's teams, imploring them to get their drivers to draft Newman on the outside at the restart. Both declined because of the opportunity to win the race. The race restarted on the 202nd lap for a green–white–checker finish extending it to 203 laps, with Johnson leading Newman and Mears, and the trio drew clear from the field. Sadler and Earnhardt achieved a good run to get back to the first three cars.

On the final lap, Earnhardt attempted to advance his position by turning right but he fell back. Then, Newman attempted to pass Johnson on the right; Mears remained with Johnson instead of drafting Newman. In turn four, Biffle spun and hit the turn four wall, causing the eleventh (and final) caution. The field was frozen in place, with the order of finish determined by where the drivers were when the caution began. This gave Johnson his maiden Daytona 500 victory, his first at a restrictor plate track (at either Talladega Superspeedway and Daytona International Speedway), and the 19th of his career. Mears finished second, ahead of Newman in third, Sadler in fourth, and Stewart in fifth. Bowyer, Vickers, Earnhardt, Schrader, and Jarrett completed the top ten finishers. There were 11 cautions and 32 lead changes among a record-breaking 18 different drivers during the race. Earnhardt's 32 laps led was the most of any competitor. Johnson led four times for a total of 24 laps.

Post-race

Johnson appeared in Victory Lane to celebrate his first Daytona 500 victory in front of a crowd of 200,000 spectators; the win earned him $1,505,124. He believed his team would win without Knaus and dedicated it to his detractors, saying, "I just have so much pride in my team with the circumstances that we've faced this week. Chad made a mistake and we're dealing with the consequences that come with that. But I think this shows how hard we work to be successful, and nobody can deny the fact that we worked out butts off and won the sport's biggest race." Mears said he was happy to take second, the fifth top-five finish of his career, "These races are so hard to get good finishes in [because] so many people can affect the outcome. Obviously we would have liked to have won [because] it would have forced Chip and Felix [Sabates, team co-owner] to put me in the Indy 500, which would have been a lot of fun. At the end of the day, it was a good finish for us, we had an excellent day and I couldn't be happier – unless we won." Third-placed Newman told Mears after the race, "You cost me a million dollars". He said he was proud to attempt a pass for the win, "I told the guys over the radio afterward, if I had that run and didn't take it, I would have had a hard time sleeping tonight – probably for the next 10 or 15 years, maybe – you never know."

With regards to the uncertainty over whether Johnson would be allowed to retain the victory, Johnson was confirmed as the winner several hours later since his car passed post-race inspection. Newman noted three of Johnson's previous wins came under scrutiny from NASCAR, adding, "This could still be the first opportunity for NASCAR to pull away a victory if the thing is illegal, I think a lot of Jimmie Johnson and his talent ... but I'm pretty sure that three of his past four wins have had conflict with the cars being illegal. It's not necessarily good for the sport." Johnson responded by targeting Newman's crew chief Matt Borland, and said that he would defend against personal criticism and that to Hendrick Motorsports. Mears spoke his belief Johnson earned the victory, "In my mind, the fact that they got caught earlier in the week took away every doubt in my mind that they'd actually do anything to cheat in this race." Hendrick Motorsports founder and owner Rick Hendrick declared Knaus' ejection from the race as unimportant and said of the issue, "We've been through inspection I don't know how many times. NASCAR did what they did, and we came back and ran two races. That was history."

Two days after the race, NASCAR announced penalties for Hendrick Motorsports and Hall of Fame Racing. Hendrick Motorsport's penalties for "actions detrimental to stock car racing", and for making an unapproved template modification to Johnson's rear window, included a $25,000 fine for Knaus, who was suspended from NASCAR until March 22, 2006. Knaus was also placed on probation until December 31, 2006; Johnson did not incur a points penalty. The team did not appeal the penalties and Grubb continued in Knaus' role until the Golden Corral 500. Hall of Fame Racing's penalties were for "actions detrimental to stock car racing", and for having a non-compliant carburetor in accordance to the 2006 NASCAR Rule Book. Crew chief Philippe Lopez was fined $25,000, and Terry Labonte and team owner Bill Saunders were penalized 25 points in the Drivers' and Owners' Championships. Hall of Fame Racing and its partner Joe Gibbs Racing announced they would appeal their penalties. The appeal was heard before a three-member National Stock Car Racing Commission on March 7 at NASCAR's Research & Development Center in Concord, North Carolina. The penalties were upheld. Hall of Fame Racing decided not to appeal further to Charles D. Strang, the NASCAR National Commissioner.

Kenseth said Stewart purposefully eliminated him from contention on lap 107. He was disenchanted with him, and urged NASCAR to address bump drafting, "There's no two ways about it. He was mad because earlier in the race when I passed him he got loose, which I didn't think I did anything wrong." Stewart argued Kenseth caused the crash, "I guess Matt didn't think anything when he got me sideways over in (Turn) 2, either. He should have thought about that first. He got back what he started in the first place. I got penalized for that." McMurray commented on his accident with Kurt Busch on lap 187, "I need to apologize to Kurt. I got into him, that was 100 percent my fault and I feel really bad because he had a car capable of winning and I kind of screwed that up for him." Earnhardt, who led the most laps of any driver with 32, said he was pleased after finishing ninth, "We had a great race car, built by all the technology and resources at DEI. … We came down here and ran great. That's what we wanted to do. I'm real proud of everybody back at the shop and all my guys down here that have been working on this car all week. It's been a long week."

As this was the first race of the season, Johnson led the Drivers' Championship with 185 points, followed by Mears and Newman in joint second with 170 points. Sadler and Stewart were fourth and fifth with 165 and 160 points, respectively. Earnhardt, Vickers, Bowyer, Schrader, and Jarrett rounded out the top ten. It was the first of five races of the 2006 season that Johnson won on the way to claiming his first of seven NASCAR Cup Series championships at the end of the season. Chevrolet led the Manufacturers' Championship with nine points, Dodge was in second with six points, and Ford followed in third with four points. The race attracted a television audience of 37 million viewers; it took 3 hours, 33 minutes, and 26 seconds to complete; because it ended under caution, no margin of victory was recorded.

Race results

Standings after the race

Drivers' Championship standings

Manufacturers' Championship standings

Note: Only the top five positions are included for the driver standings.

Notes and references

Notes

References

Daytona 500
Daytona 500
NASCAR races at Daytona International Speedway
Daytona 500